Galerina vittiformis is a species of agaric fungus in the family Hymenogastraceae, and the type species of the genus Galerina. It is widely distributed in temperate regions, where it typically grows in moist locations, often among mosses. The fungus has been shown to bioaccumulate various heavy metal from contaminated soil.

References

Fungi described in 1838
Hymenogastraceae
Taxa named by Elias Magnus Fries